The Seventeenth Texas Legislature met from January 11, 1881 to May 5, 1882 in its regular session and one called session. All members of the House of Representatives and about half of the members of the Senate were elected in 1880 General Election.

Sessions
17th Regular session: January 11–April 1, 1881
17th First called session: April 6–May 5, 1882

Party summary

Officers

Senate
 Lieutenant Governor
 Leonidas Jefferson Storey, Democrat
 President pro tempore
 Edwin Hobby, Democrat, Regular session
 Francis Marion Martin, Democrat, ad interim, First called session

House of Representatives
 Speaker of the House
 George Robertson Reeves, Democrat

Members
Members of the Seventeenth Texas Legislature as of the beginning of the Regular Session, January 11, 1881:

Senate

House of Representatives

Benjamin M. Baker
Thomas Beck
William John Caven
R. J. Evans
George Finlay
George Washington Lafayette Fly
Lafayette Lumpkin Foster
Charles Reese Gibson
Andrew Jackson Harris
William Kercheval Homan
Joseph Chappell Hutcheson
Robert A. Kerr
Felix J. McCord
Absolom C. Oliver
Henry Joseph Richarz
Thomas A. Rodríguez
George Robertson Reeves
Benjamin Dudley Tarlton
George T. Todd
Arthur Tompkins
John Henry Traylor
James W. Truitt
William Wallace Weatherred
Charles Louis Wurzbach

Membership Changes

External links

17th Texas Legislature
1881 in Texas
1882 in Texas
1881 U.S. legislative sessions
1882 U.S. legislative sessions